The 1939 NCAA Wrestling Championships were the 12th NCAA Wrestling Championships to be held. Franklin & Marshall College in Lancaster, Pennsylvania hosted the tournament at the Mayser Physical Education Center.

Oklahoma A&M took home the team championship with 33 points and having three individual champions.

Dale Hanson of Minnesota was named the Outstanding Wrestler.

Team results

Individual finals

References

NCAA Division I Wrestling Championship
Wrestling competitions in the United States
1939 in American sports
Philly Pennsylvania